The third season of the crime and action drama Magnum P.I. premiered on December 4, 2020, on CBS, for the 2020–21 United States network television schedule. The series is a remake of the 1980 series of the same name and centers on Thomas Magnum, a former Navy SEAL who works as a private investigator and solves mysteries with his business partner Juliet Higgins and other friends. It stars Jay Hernandez, Perdita Weeks, Zachary Knighton, Stephen Hill, Amy Hill, and Tim Kang. The season was ordered on May 8, 2020. It was later revealed that the season would only consist of 16 episodes as a result of the COVID-19 pandemic in the United States. Multiple Hawaii Five-0 stars appeared as their Hawaii Five-0 characters in minor crossover events throughout the season and a possible crossover between the series and MacGyver was discussed by the writers. Magnum P.I., Hawaii Five-0, and MacGyver are collectively referred to as the Lenkov-verse.

This is the first season not to feature co-developer Peter M. Lenkov as co-showrunner and executive producer after he was fired over allegations for a toxic work environment. Eric Guggenheim, who also co-developed the series and served as co-showrunner and executive producer alongside Lenkov, took over the main day-to-day operations of the series. In addition, Gene Hong, a writer and executive producer for the series, also became a co-showrunner. Production crew from Hawaii Five-0, including a writer, a line producer, and a cinematographer, moved to the series after Hawaii Five-0s cancellation. The season premiere, "Double Jeopardy," was watched by 5.50 million viewers.

Cast and characters

Main
 Jay Hernandez as Thomas Magnum, a former Navy SEAL who is a security consultant for the successful novelist Robin Masters, living in the guest house on his estate, while also working as a private investigator
 Perdita Weeks as Juliet Higgins, a former MI6 agent who is majordomo to Robin Masters; she and Magnum bicker but become allies
 Zachary Knighton as Orville "Rick" Wright, a Marine veteran and former door gunner, who runs his own tiki bar and is also a playboy
 Stephen Hill as Theodore "T.C." Calvin, a Marine veteran and helicopter pilot who runs helicopter tours of Hawaii and is a member of Magnum's team
 Amy Hill as Teuila "Kumu" Tuileta, the cultural curator of Robin Masters' estate
 Tim Kang as Honolulu Police Department (HPD) Detective Gordon Katsumoto, who dislikes Magnum but usually comes to the team's aid when needed

Recurring
 Jay Ali as Dr. Ethan Shah
 Christopher Thornton as Kenny "Shammy" Shamberg
 Lance Lim as Dennis Katsumoto
 Betsy Phillips as Suzy Madison

Notable guests

 Paola Nunez as Helen
 Brian Letscher as Bruce
 Juan-Pablo Veizaga as Max Martinez
 Hayden Szeto as Det. Pono Palima
 Dominic Hoffman as USCIS Tenney
 Eric Ladin as Freddie
 Eddie Lee Anderson as HPD SWAT Commander Fong
 Leith Burke as CIA Officer Grayson
 Roger E. Mosley as John Booky
 Janel Parrish as Maleah
 Bobby Lee as Jin Jeong
 Corbin Bernsen as Francis "Icepick" Hofstetler
 Kelen Coleman as Gina Gow
 Steven Michael Quezada as Uncle Bernardo
 Grace Victoria Cox as Chloe Dawson
 Alex Carter as Henry Sellers

Crossover

 Kimee Balmilero as Dr. Noelani Cunha
 Shawn Mokuahi Garnett as Flippa
 Dennis Chun as HPD Sergeant Duke Lukela

Episodes

The number in the "No. overall" column refers to the episode's number within the overall series, whereas the number in the "No. in season" column refers to the episode's number within this particular season. Numerous episodes are named after similarly named episodes from the original series. "Production code" refers to the order in which the episodes were produced while "U.S. viewers (millions)" refers to the number of viewers in the U.S. in millions who watched the episode as it was aired.

Crossovers

Following the cancellation of Hawaii Five-0 in early 2020, numerous actors from the series still made appearances throughout the season, most notably Kimee Balmilero who recurred in the season as Dr. Noelani Cunha. In addition Shawn Mokuahi Garnett appeared in two episodes of the season as Flippa and Dennis Chun appeared as Honolulu Police Department Sergeant Duke Lukela in the seasons fourth episode.

Production

Development
 On May 6, 2020, CBS renewed Magnum P.I. for a third season, along with eighteen other series including MacGyver, the second and only other remaining series from the Lenkov-verse after the cancellation of Hawaii Five-0. On July 7, 2020, it was revealed that co-showrunner, executive producer, and co-developer Peter M. Lenkov would not have any involvement in the season after being fired from CBS over toxic work environment allegations. Lenkov was originally expected to continue work on the series for another year after signing a three-year deal with CBS Television Studios in 2018. Lucas Till who portrays the title character of Angus MacGyver on MacGyver stated that Lenkov made him suicidal and constantly body shamed him. Lenkov's lawyers initially denied all allegations. Lenkov later responded to the situation by stating "It's difficult to hear that the working environment I ran was not the working environment my colleagues deserved, and for that, I am deeply sorry. I accept responsibility for what I am hearing and am committed to doing the work that is required to do better and be better." Lenkov still received writing credits for various episodes throughout the season written prior to his termination. Numerous production staff moved to the series also following the cancellation of Hawaii Five-0 including co-showrunner of its final season, David Wolkove, a line producer, and editors. Eight different writers wrote episodes throughout the season. Gene Hong replaced Lenkov as co-showrunner joining other co-showrunner Eric Guggenheim who also co-developed and executive-produces for the series. On October 27, 2020, it was reported that the season would have a reduced episode order of sixteen-episodes as a result of the COVID-19 pandemic. The season's main storylines revolved around a post-pandemic world; however, its effects continue to play a part in storylines throughout the season.

Filming
On July 1, 2020, it was revealed that the series was eyeing a delayed mid-August start date to begin filming as a result of the COVID-19 pandemic. Previous seasons had begun filming in July. In August 2020, it was announced that the series had been given permission to begin filming but had yet to set a start date; September 14, was later stated as a tentative start date to filming. Filming for the season began two days later on September 16, 2020, with a traditional Hawaiian blessing. COVID-19 protocols were required on set including the wearing of masks, social distancing, COVID testing, and reduced cast and crew on set. Due to the limited numbers of extras allowed on the set, crowd replication visual effects were used as a replacement. Kurt Jones, a cinematographer for the season, who also worked on Hawaii Five-0, directed the fifteenth produced episode of the season. Filming on the season concluded on March 4, 2021.

Casting
On October 16, 2020, it was announced that Jay Ali had been cast in a recurring role for the season as Dr. Ethan Shah, a love interest for the character of Juliet Higgins. It was later revealed that Lance Lim would also recur throughout the season as Dennis Katsumoto, the son of Detective Gordon Katsumoto. Roger E. Mosley, who portrayed Theodore Calvin on the original Magnum, P.I. reprised his role as John Booky from the first season of the rebooted series. Dennis Chun, who portrayed various minor characters on the original series also returned as Honolulu Police Department Sergeant Duke Lukela. Christopher Thornton, Kimee Balmilero, and Shawn Mokuahi Garnett continue to recur in the series after being introduced in the first season. Bobby Lee and Janel Parrish also reprised their roles after both being introduced as characters in the second season.

Marketing and release
When CBS revealed its fall schedule for the 2020–2021 broadcast season it was revealed that Magnum P.I. would keep the timeslot it held in the previous season of Friday's at 9:00 PM ET. On October 21, 2020, CBS announced premiere dates for its scripted series; Magnum P.I. and its Friday evening counterparts Blue Bloods and MacGyver remained absent from the schedule. On November 9, 2020, CBS gave the season a premiere date of December 4, 2020; delayed from its usual late-September premiere date as a result of the COVID-19 pandemic. The season aired three episodes in December 2020 before taking its regular mid-season break and returned in January 2021. "The Lies We Tell," the seasons eleventh episode was originally scheduled to air on March 12, 2021. When CBS chose to air a rebroadcast of Oprah with Meghan and Harry in its place the episode was rescheduled to be broadcast on March 26. In March 2021, CBS announced that the season would conclude on May 7, 2021. In Canada, CTV aired the series in simulcast with CBS. In the United Kingdom, the third season began airing on Sky One on January 3, 2021.

Viewing figures

Home media

References

2020 American television seasons
2021 American television seasons
Magnum, P.I.
Television productions postponed due to the COVID-19 pandemic
Television shows about the COVID-19 pandemic